Flora is a village in the municipality of Selbu in Trøndelag county, Norway. The Flora Chapel is located in this village.

References

Selbu
Villages in Trøndelag